Jember Sport Garden Stadium is a multi-purpose stadium in Ajung, Jember Regency, East Java, Indonesia. It is mostly used for football matches and is the new home stadium of Persid Jember.

References

Buildings and structures in East Java
Multi-purpose stadiums in Indonesia
Football venues in Indonesia